This page includes the discography of singer Glykeria.

Albums

All the albums listed underneath were released and charted in Greece and Cyprus.

Singles
Listed below are the CD singles released by Glykeria.

International Releases

Albums
All the albums listed underneath were released and charted internationally.

Singles

Discographies of Greek artists
Pop music discographies